Ean Libya (Arabic: عين ليبيا) is an online, Tripoli based Arabic language news website focusing on events in Libya, North Africa.

The Editor in Chief is Dr Ramadan Mohammed supported by Editorial Director Ali Hussein.

Mass media in Libya